WWOK may refer to:

 WWOK-LP, a radio station licensed to serve Greenville, South Carolina, United States
 WFNT, a radio station licensed to serve Flint, Michigan, United States, which held the call sign WWOK from 1947 to 1953
 WGFY, a radio station licensed to serve Charlotte, North Carolina, United States, which held the call sign WWOK from 1955 to 1969
 WSUA, a radio station licensed to serve Miami, Florida, United States, which held the call sign WWOK from 1969 to 1980
 WSML, a radio station licensed to serve Graham, North Carolina, United States, which held the call sign WWOK from 1981 to 1982
 WRSF, a radio station licensed to serve Columbia, North Carolina, United States, which held the call sign WWOK from 1982 to 1987
 WGBF (AM), a radio station licensed to serve Evansville, Indiana, United States, which held the call sign WWOK from 1989 to 1995